Kim Bub-min (born 22 May 1991, Daejeon) is a South Korean archer. At the 2012 Summer Olympics, he competed for his country, alongside partners Im Dong-hyun and Oh Jin-hyek in the Men's team event, finishing in third place. He also competed in the men's individual event, finishing in 5th place. He was ranked in second after the ranking round, then beat Rob Elder, Tarundeep Rai and Dan Olaru in the elimination rounds, before losing to Dai Xiaoxiang in the quarterfinals.

References

External links
 
 

South Korean male archers
Living people
Olympic archers of South Korea
Archers at the 2012 Summer Olympics
Olympic bronze medalists for South Korea
1991 births
Sportspeople from Daejeon
Olympic medalists in archery
Medalists at the 2012 Summer Olympics
Universiade medalists in archery
Universiade gold medalists for South Korea
Universiade bronze medalists for South Korea
South Korean Buddhists
21st-century South Korean people